ASC CS Sucrière is a Senegalese football club based in Richard Toll.

They played in the top division in Senegalese football and is currently part of the Senegalese Second Division. Their home stadium is Stade Municipal de Richard Toll.

Achievements

Performance in CAF competitions
2006 CAF Confederation Cup: first round

Current squad

References

External links
Team profile

Football clubs in Senegal